Robert Clifford Jones (March 30, 1936 – February 1, 2021) was an American film editor, screenwriter, and educator. He received an Academy Award for the screenplay of the film Coming Home (1978). As an editor, Jones had notable collaborations with the directors Arthur Hiller (seven films from 1967 to 1992) and Hal Ashby (four films from 1973 to 1982). Jones was nominated three times for the Academy Award for Best Film Editing: It's a Mad, Mad, Mad, Mad World (1963), Guess Who's Coming to Dinner (1967), and Bound for Glory (1976).

Early life
Jones was born in Los Angeles on March 30, 1936. His father, Harmon Jones, was a Canadian-born film editor who was nominated for an Oscar for his work on Gentleman's Agreement. Jones enrolled in college, but subsequently dropped out and worked at a shipping room for 20th Century Fox. He started off as an assistant film editor for movies like Untamed (1955) and The Long, Hot Summer (1958). He described his job as "magic", adding that it had "opened my eyes to what my dad had done".

After being drafted into the U.S. Army, Jones worked at the Army Pictorial Center from 1958 to 1960. Even though he did not attend film school or have any formal training in editing, he was thrust into the role of a film editor. He was responsible for editing Army training films, documentaries, and several segments of The Big Picture television program. He credits this stint for giving him the "experience and confidence" needed to pursue a career in film editing.

Career
Upon his return from military service, Jones collaborated with Gene Fowler Jr. to edit A Child Is Waiting and It's a Mad, Mad, Mad, Mad World (both released in 1963). He was nominated for the Academy Award for Best Film Editing for the latter film. He then increased his editing credentials by working on The Tiger Makes Out (1967) and Paint Your Wagon (1969). His work in Guess Who's Coming to Dinner (1967) earned him his second Oscar nomination for Best Film Editing. Almost a decade elapsed before he received his third Academy Award editing nomination for the musical drama Bound for Glory (1976).

Jones was also involved in writing film scripts. He initially declined to work on Coming Home (1978) as editor when Hal Ashby asked him. However, he relented and joined as a screenwriter after Waldo Salt suffered a heart attack two months before the start of production. That film ultimately won the 1979 Academy Award for Best Writing, Screenplay Written Directly for the Screen, which he shared with Salt and Nancy Dowd. Jones was surprised by the win and stated that going on stage to receive the award marked the first time he met Salt and Dowd. He was then the co-screenwriter for Being There (1979), which his daughter said he rewrote. Although he was originally granted credit by the studio (United Artists–Lorimar Productions), the Writers Guild reversed that in an arbitration decision and awarded credit only to Jerzy Kosiński, the author of the book that the movie was based on. Jones believed that his "writing career would have been a whole lot different if [he] had gotten screen credit" and that "it was a dark day in my life". He consequently focused on editing for the remainder of his career.

The final film Jones edited was Unconditional Love, released in 2002. After retiring from the film industry, he became a professor at the School of Cinematic Arts of the University of Southern California (USC), serving in that capacity for 15 years. He was presented with the American Cinema Editors Career Achievement Award in February 2014.

Personal life
Jones was married to Sylvia Hirsch Jones, a professor of psychology, for 59 years until his death. Together, they had two daughters: Hayley and Leslie, who followed her father's footsteps and was nominated for the Academy Award for Best Film Editing. She assisted Jones during the early part of her career on films like See No Evil, Hear No Evil and The Babe.

Jones died on February 1, 2021, at his home in Los Angeles. He was 84, and suffered from Lewy body dementia in the time leading up to his death.

Filmography
The director for each film is indicated in parentheses.

Writer

Being There (Uncredited) (Hal Ashby – 1979)
Coming Home (Hal Ashby – 1978). Academy Award and Writers Guild Award for Best Screenplay.

Editor

 2000s
Unconditional Love (P. J. Hogan – 2002)
 1990s
Crazy in Alabama (Antonio Banderas – 1999)
Bulworth (Warren Beatty – 1998)
City Hall (Harold Becker – 1996)
Love Affair (Glenn Gordon Caron – 1994)
The Babe (Arthur Hiller – 1992)
Beyond the Law (Larry Ferguson – 1992)
Married to It (Arthur Hiller – 1991)
Days of Thunder (Tony Scott – 1990)
 1980s
See No Evil, Hear No Evil (Arthur Hiller – 1989)
Twice in a Lifetime (Bud Yorkin – 1985)
Lookin' to Get Out (Hal Ashby – 1982)
 1970s
Heaven Can Wait (Warren Beatty and Buck Henry – 1978)
Bound for Glory (Hal Ashby – 1976). Nominated for Best Editing Oscar.
Shampoo (Hal Ashby – 1975)
The Crazy World of Julius Vrooder (1974)
The Last Detail (Hal Ashby – 1973)
Man of La Mancha (Arthur Hiller – 1972)
The New Centurions (Richard Fleischer – 1972)
Cisco Pike (Bill L. Norton – 1972)
Love Story (Arthur Hiller – 1970)
 1960s
Paint Your Wagon (Joshua Logan – 1969)
I Love You, Alice B. Toklas (Hy Averback – 1968)
Guess Who's Coming to Dinner (Stanley Kramer – 1967). Nominated for Best Editing Oscar and for ACE Eddie.
The Tiger Makes Out (Arthur Hiller – 1967)
Tobruk (Arthur Hiller – 1967)
Don't Worry, We'll Think of a Title (Harmon Jones – 1966)
The Trouble with Angels (Ida Lupino – 1966)
Ship of Fools (Stanley Kramer – 1965)
Invitation to a Gunfighter (Richard Wilson – 1964)
It's a Mad, Mad, Mad, Mad World (Stanley Kramer – 1963). Nominated for Best Editing Oscar and for ACE Eddie.
A Child Is Waiting (John Cassavetes – 1963)

Academy Awards

See also
List of film director and editor collaborations

Notes

References

Further reading

External links

Robert C. Jones at Imsdb.com
Robert C. Jones Awards

1936 births
2021 deaths
American film editors
American male screenwriters
Best Original Screenplay Academy Award winners
Film people from Los Angeles
Military personnel from California
Deaths from dementia in California
Deaths from Lewy body dementia